Raffi Ahmad is an Indonesian presenter, actor, and singer. He has been cast in a number of soap operas, television movies, and feature films. He is also involved in advertising and as a host. He has received many awards, including 2 Dahsyatnya Awards, 2 Global Seru Awards, 2 Infotainment Awards, 7 Insert Awards, 2 Nickelodeon Indonesia Kids' Choice Awards, 6 Panasonic Awards, 1 SCTV Awards, and 2 Yahoo! OMG Awards. This is list awards was received by Raffi.

Ada-Ada Aja Awards
The Ada-Ada Aja Awards are an awards ceremony were presented by Global TV and program Ada-Ada Aja for celebrities whose had to be guest star in the Global TV' reality show. Raffi has received one award.

!
|-
| 2016
| Raffi Ahmad
| Most Busiest Artist
| 
| 
|-

Anugerah Musik Indonesia
The Anugerah Musik Indonesia (English translation: Indonesian Music Awards), is an annual Indonesian major music awards. They have been compared to the American Grammy Awards and British Brit Awards. The award was formalized in 1997 by ASIRI (Association of Indonesia Recording Industry), PAPPRI (Association of Indonesian Singers, Songwriters and Music Record Producers), and KCI (Copyright Office of Indonesia). It is the highest music awards given to outstanding artists in Indonesia.

!
|-
| 2011
| "50 Tahun Lagi" (feat. Yuni Shara)
| Best Collaboration Production Work
| 
|
|-

Bintang RPTI Awards

!
|-
| 2011
| rowspan= "6" | Raffi Ahmad
| rowspan= "3" | Favorite Presenter
| 
| 
|-
| 2012
| 
| 
|-
| 2013
| 
| 
|-
| rowspan= "3" | 2014
| Favorite Male Presenter
| 
| 
|-
| Favorite Star Advertisement
| 
| 
|-
| Celebrity Top Rating of the Year
| 
| 
|-

Bright Awards
The Bright Awards is a giving awards to creative people the world of advertising the country on television advertising are considered the most communicative. This awards show has teamed up with MNC Media and Unity of Indonesian Advertising Companies. Raffi has received four awards.

!
|-
| rowspan= "4" | 2016
| rowspan= "2" | Raffi Ahmad
| Favorite Male Star Advertisement
| 
| rowspan= "4" | 
|-
| The Brightest Star
| 
|-
| rowspan= "2" | Raffi Ahmad & Nagita Slavina
| Favorite  Star Advertisement Couple
| 
|-
| Star Advertisement Couple (based on a survey of television viewers)
| 
|-

Dahsyatnya Awards
First established in 2009, the Dahsyatnya Awards are an annual awards presented by the daily Indonesian TV show Dahsyat, to honour for musician who to be outstanding in music and entertainment. Raffi was received two awards from 10 nominations.

!
|-
| 2011
| rowspan= "2" | Raffi Ahmad & Yuni Shara
| rowspan= "2" | Outstanding Duo/Group Singer
| 
|
|-
| 2012
| 
|
|-
| rowspan= "4" | 2014
| Raffi Ahmad & Mikha Tambayong
| rowspan= "3" | Outstanding Couple
| 
| rowspan= "4" |
|-
| Raffi Ahmad & Syahrini
| 
|-
| Raffi Ahmad & Nagita Slavina
| 
|-
| When Raffi Ahmad Back
| Outstanding Moment
| 
|-
| rowspan= "3" | 2015
| Raffi Pursuit of Love to Nagita
| Outstanding Moment
| 
| rowspan= "3" | 
|-
| Raffi Ahmad's Birthday
| Outstanding Birthday
| 
|-
| rowspan= "2" | Raffi Ahmad & Nagita Slavina
| rowspan= "2" | Outstanding Couple
| 
|-
| 2016
| 
| 
|-

Fokus Selebriti Awards

!
|-
| rowspan= "2" | 2014
| Raffi Ahmad
| Focused Male Celebrity
| 
| rowspan= "2" | 
|-
| Raffi Ahmad (with Yuni Shara and Wanda Hamidah)
| rowspan= "2" | Hottest News
| 
|-
| 2015
| Raffi Ahmad & Nagita Slavina
| 
|
|-

Global Seru Awards
The Global Seru Awards are awarded to celebrities who have caught the attention of the public through interesting or exciting accomplishments. Raffi was received two awards.

!
|-
| 2014
| rowspan= "2" | Raffi Ahmad
| rowspan= "2" | Most Exciting Presenter
| 
| 
|-
| 2015
| 
|
|-

Inbox Awards
The Inbox Awards are an awards ceremony were presented by Indonesian TV program Inbox and SCTV for appreciated for talent in music and entertainment. It is first launched in 2008. 

!
|-
| 2011
| rowspan= "2" | Raffi Ahmad & Yuni Shara
| rowspan= "2" | Most Inbox Couple
| 
|
|-
| 2012
| 
|
|-

Indonesian Social Media Awards
First established on 2016, the Indonesian Social Media Awards are an awards were presented by SCTV to honour for celebrity in social media, which recognized for most exist and favorite. Raffi has received one award from 2 nominations.

!
|-
| rowspan= "2" | 2016
| rowspan= "2" | Raffi Ahmad
| Male Celeb Facebook
| 
| rowspan= "2" | 
|-
| Male Celeb Twitter
| 
|-

Indonesian Television Awards
The Indonesian Television Awards are an awards were given to talent for appreciated of motivation and innovation in entertainment and program television, based on social media voting. Raffi has received three awards.

!
|-
| 2016
| rowspan= "2" | Raffi Ahmad
| rowspan= "2" | Most Popular Presenter
| 
| 
|-
| rowspan= "2" | 2017
| 
| rowspan= "2" | 

|-
| Raffi Ahmad & Denny Cagur
| Most Popular Duet Presenter
| 
|-
| 2018
| rowspan= "1" | Raffi Ahmad & Nagita Slavina
| rowspan= "1" | The Most Popular Couple of TV Programs
| 
|
|-

Infotainment Awards
The Infotainment Awards is an award presented by SCTV since 2012. Raffi has received two awards from 7 nominations.

!
|-
| 2012
| Raffi Ahmad & Yuni Shara
| Most Infotainment Celebrity Couple
| 
|
|-
| rowspan= "3" | 2015
| rowspan= "2" | Raffi Ahmad & Nagita Slavina
| Most Romantic Celebrity Couple
| 
| rowspan= "3" | 
|-
| Most Phenomenal Celebrity Wedding
| 
|-
| rowspan= "2" | Raffi Ahmad
| Celebrity of the Year
| 
|-
| rowspan= "2" | 2016
| Gorgeous Dad
| 
| rowspan= "2" | 
|-
| Raffi Ahmad & Nagita Slavina
| Most Romantic Celebrity Couple
| 
|-
| 2017
| Raffi Ahmad
| Gorgeous Dad
| 
| 
|-

Insert Awards

!
|-
| 2010
| Raffi Ahmad & Yuni Shara
| Best Celebrity Couple
| 
|
|-
| rowspan= "2" | 2013
| Raffi Ahmad
| Celebrity of the Decade
| 
| rowspan= "2" | 
|-
| Raffi Ahmad Arrested
| rowspan= "2" | The Hottest Celebrity News
| 
|-
| rowspan= "3" | 2014
| Raffi Ahmad & Nagita Slavina Marriage
| 
| rowspan= "3" | 
|-
| Raffi Ahmad
| The Iconic Celebrity
| 
|-
| rowspan= "2" | Raffi Ahmad & Nagita Slavina
| Celebrity Couple of the Year
| 
|-
| 2015
| VIP of the Year
| 
| 
|-

Instagram Awards

!
|-
| rowspan= "2" | 2017
| rowspan= "2" | Raffi Ahmad & Nagita Slavina
| Most Interaction Award
| 
| rowspan= "2" | 
|-
| Top 5 Most Followers
| 
|-

JawaPos.com Readers Choice Awards
The JawaPos.com Readers Choice Awards was an online awards have first established in 2017 by newspaper Jawa Pos, to honour for public figure in music, film and entertainment.

!
|-
| 2017
| Raffi Ahmad
| Favorite Host
| 
|
|-

Mom & Kids Awards
Introduced on 2015, the Mom & Kids Awards are an awards to honour for artist in music and entertainment as inspiration to mother and kids. Raffi was received two awards from 6 nominations.

!
|-
| rowspan= "3" | 2016
| rowspan= "2" | Raffi Ahmad
| Favorite Host
| 
| rowspan= "3" | 
|-
| Favorite Daddy
| 
|-
| rowspan= "2" | Raffi Ahmad & Nagita Slavina
| rowspan= "2" | Favorite Family
| 
|-
| rowspan= "3" | 2017
| 
| rowspan= "3" | 
|-
| Raffi Ahmad
| Favorite Daddy
| 
|-
| Raffi Ahmad & Rafathar
| Favorite Daddy & Kids
| 
|-

MTV Indonesia Movie Awards
The MTV Indonesia Movie Awards is an awards show in Indonesia, which was established in 1995. The show is based on the United States movie awards, MTV Movie Awards, and celebrates local films and actors.

!
|-
| 2007
| Love is Cinta
| Most Favorite Actor
| 
| 
|-

Nickelodeon Indonesia Kids' Choice Awards
The Nickelodeon Indonesia Kids' Choice Awards is Indonesian version of Nickelodeon Kids' Choice Awards, held since 2008 in Jakarta. Raffi was received three awards from 13 nominations.

!
|-
| rowspan= "2" | 2008
| rowspan= "10" | Raffi Ahmad
| Favorite Actor
| 
| rowspan= "2" | 
|-
| Indonesian Star Wannabe Award
| 
|-
| rowspan= "3" | 2009
| Favorite Actor
| 
| rowspan= "3" | 
|-
| Favorite Presenter
| 
|-
| Indonesian Star Wannabe Award
| 
|-
| rowspan= "2" | 2010
| Favorite Actor
| 
| rowspan= "2" | 
|-
| Favorite Presenter
| 
|-
| rowspan= "2" | 2011
| Favorite Actor
| 
| rowspan= "2" | 
|-
| Favorite Presenter
| 
|-
| 2015
| Favorite Host
| 
| 
|-
| 2016
| rowspan= "2" | Raffi Ahmad & Nagita Slavina
| Favorite Television Couple
| 
| 
|-
| rowspan= "2" | 2017
| Favorite Family Artist
| 
| rowspan= "2" | 
|-
| Raffi Ahmad
| Favorite Presenter
| 
|-

Obsesi Awards

!
|-
| 2016
| Raffi Ahmad
| Most Exist Celebrity
| 
|
|-

Panasonic Awards
The Panasonic Awards is an award presented to television programs and individuals, based on poll results. The poll was originally conducted by the Indonesian tabloid Citra, but was taken over by Nielsen Media Research in 2004. Raffi was received seven awards from 11 nominations.

!
|-
| 2007
| Olivia
| Favorite Actor
| 
|
|-
| 2009
| rowspan= "5" | Dahsyat
| rowspan= "5" | Favorite Music/Variety Show Presenter
| 
|
|-
| 2010
| 
|
|-
| 2011
| 
|
|-
| 2012
| 
| 
|-
| rowspan= "2" | 2013
| 
| rowspan= "2" | 

|-
| Kata Hati
| Favorite Entertainment Talkshow Presenter
| 
|-
| rowspan= "2" | 2014
| Putri Nomor 1
| Favorite Actor
| 
| rowspan= "2" | 
|-
| rowspan= "4" | Dahsyat
| Favorite Entertainment Program Presenter
| 
|-
| 2015
| Favorite Music/Variety Show & Entertainment Program Host
| 
| 
|-
| 2016
| Favorite Entertainment Program Presenter
| 
| 
|-
| 2017
| Favorite Music/Variety Show/Search Talent & Reality Show Program Presenter
| 
| 
|-

Pop Awards
The Pop Awards is an awards for celebrities which pervasive inspire the younger generation. The show was first held in 2016, which aired on RCTI. Raffi has received two awards.

!
|-
| rowspan= "2" | 2016
| Raffi Ahmad & Irwansyah
| Best Friend Pop Awards
| 
| rowspan= "2" | 
|-
| Raffi Ahmad & Syahnaz Sadiqah
| Family Pop Awards
| 
|-

Rumpi Awards

!
|-
| 2016
| Happy Show
| Excessive Host
| 
|
|-

SCTV Awards
The SCTV Awards are an annual awards were presented by the Indonesian television station SCTV for talent who recognized of appreciated in music and entertainment, based on audience votes. Raffi has received one award from 2 nominations.

!
|-
| 2006
| Jurangan Jengkol
| rowspan= "2" | Famous Actor
| 
|
|-
| 2007
| Romantika Remaja
| 
|
|-

Seleb On News Awards
The Seleb On News Awards are an awards ceremony for the celebrities which to be part from the same program show on MNCTV. Raffi has received three awards from 5 nominations.

!
|-
| rowspan= "2" | 2016
| Raffi Ahmad & Nagita Slavina
| Most Wanted Celeb
| 
| rowspan= "2" | 
|-
| rowspan= "3" | Raffi Ahmad
| Most Social Media Celeb
| 
|-
| rowspan= "3" | 2017
| Favorite Host
| 
| rowspan= "3" | 
|-
| Most Coolest Dad
| 
|-
| Raffi Ahmad & Nagita Slavina
| Most Social Media Celeb
| 
|-

Selebrita Awards
The Selebrita Awards are awarded for celebrity who had appreciated in entertainment, based on voted by fans in websites. Raffi has received two awards from 8 nominations.

!
|-
| rowspan= "2" | 2015
| Raffi Ahmad & Nagita Slavina
| Most Celeb Couple
| 
| rowspan= "2" | 
|-
| rowspan= "3" | Raffi Ahmad
| rowspan= "2" | Most Exist Celeb
| 
|-
| rowspan= "3" | 2016
| 
| rowspan= "3" | 
|-
| Sensational Celeb
| 
|-
| rowspan= "2" | Raffi Ahmad & Nagita Slavina
| rowspan= "2" | Most Celeb Couple
| 
|-
| rowspan= "3" | 2017
| 
| rowspan= "3" | 

|-
| Raffi Ahmad
| Most Exist Celeb
| 
|-
| Dahsyat
| Most Celeb Male Presenter
| 
|-

Silet Awards
The Silet Awards are an awards ceremony were established in 2014 and presented by infotainment Silet, to be awarded to the celebrity who had become popular in entertainment. Raffi was received two awards.

!
|-
| 2014
| Raffi Ahmad & Nagita Slavina
| Razored Romance
| 
| 
|-
| 2017
| RANS
| Razored Family
| 
| 
|-

Socmed Awards
The Socmed Awards is an awards to celebrities and public figures who dominated the popularity of various social media platforms, such as Twitter, Instagram, Blogs, and YouTube. Raffi was received one award.

!
|-
| 2016
| Raffi Ahmad
| Celeb Twit Male
| 
| 
|-

Yahoo OMG! Awards
Launched in 2012 by Yahoo! Indonesia, the Yahoo! OMG Awards are awarded to honour for celebrity in entertainment, based on online voting in the website. Raffi was received two awards from 5 nominations.

!
|-
| rowspan= "2" | 2012
| Raffi Ahmad & Yuni Shara
| Favorite Couple
| 
|
|-
| rowspan= "3" | Raffi Ahmad
| Most Wanted Male
| 
| rowspan= "3" | 
|-
| rowspan= "2" | 2013
| Most Talked About
| 
|-
| Controversial Celeb Criminal Case
| 
|-
| 2014
| Raffi Ahmad & Nagita Slavina
| Favorite Couple
| 
| 
|-

YKS Romantic Awards
The YKS Romantic Awards is an awards show presented by Yuk Keep Smile, a TV show which is broadcast on Trans TV. The awards show is held on February 14 every year to coincide with Valentine Day. Raffi has received one award from 3 nominations.

!
|-
| rowspan= "3" | 2014
| rowspan= "3" | Raffi Ahmad
| Most Shocked Appearance
| 
| 
|-
| Most Surprised Artist
| 
| 
|-
| Most Lulled Artist
| 
| 
|-

YouTube Awards

!
|-
| 2017
| rowspan= "2" | Raffi Ahmad & Nagita Slavina
| Rans Entertainment Channel Passing 100 000 Subscribers - Silver Play Button
| 
| 
|-
| 2018
| Rans Entertainment Channel Passing 1 000 000 Subscribers - Gold Play Button
| 
|  
|-

Honor Awards, Magazine, Newspaper

Bintang Magazine

!
|-
| 2011
| rowspan= "2" | Raffi Ahmad
| Most Shining Star
| 
|
|-
| 2012
| Richest Young Celebrity
| 
|
|-

Intens (Entertainment Program of RCTI)

!
|-
| 2012
| Raffi Ahmad
| Most Inspirations Artist
| 
|
|-

Silet (Entertainment Program of RCTI)

!
|-
| 2013
| Raffi Ahmad
| Razored Artist
| 
| 
|-

References

Ahmad
Ahmad